Delos Rodeyn Ashley (February 19, 1828 – July 18, 1873) was a California and Nevada politician who served as State Treasurer of California and a member of the United States House of Representatives from Nevada.

Biography
Ashley was born at Arkansas Post, Arkansas Territory, on February 19, 1828. He received his education in the local schools, then studied law with an attorney in Monroe, Michigan. He was admitted to the bar in 1849, and moved to Monterey, California, where he established a practice.

As a member of the Democratic Party, Ashley served as district attorney of Monterey County from 1851 to 1852. From 1854 to 1855 he represented the 3rd District in the California State Assembly. From 1856 to 1857 he served in the California State Senate as a member of the Know Nothings. During his senate term, he was the body's president pro tempore. He later became a Republican, and he served as California State Treasurer from 1862 to 1863.

In 1864 Ashley moved to Virginia City, Nevada. In 1865, news accounts indicated he had been a passenger aboard the steamship Yosemite when her boiler exploded, killing 55 and injuring and burning dozens more. Ashley was blown into the Sacramento River, and escaped the wreck by swimming to shore.

Later that year he was elected to the United States House of Representatives from Nevada's at-large district. He was reelected in 1866 and served from March 4, 1865 to March 3, 1869. He was not a candidate for reelection in 1868. During his Congressional service, Ashley was chairman of the Committee on Mines and Mining.

He moved to Pioche, Nevada, in 1871 and resumed practicing law. When his health began to fail in 1872, Ashley moved to San Francisco, California, where he lived in retirement until his death on July 18, 1873. He was buried at Calvary Cemetery in San Francisco, and was later part of a mass reburial of Calvary Cemetery remains at Holy Cross Catholic Cemetery in Colma, California, Section H.

Family
Ashley was the husband of Annie (McNamara) Ashley (1835–1885). They were the parents of four children:

Delos Richard Ashley (1852–1932)
Annie Rosalie Ashley O'Connell (1854–1899), the wife of Daniel O'Connell
Ida Inez Ashley Eddy (1861–1932)
Victoria Frances Ashley (1864–1864)

References

External links

1828 births
1873 deaths
People from Arkansas County, Arkansas
Burials at Holy Cross Cemetery (Colma, California)
Politicians from San Francisco
State treasurers of California
Republican Party California state senators
Republican Party members of the California State Assembly
Republican Party members of the United States House of Representatives from Nevada
19th-century American politicians
Burials at Calvary Cemetery (San Francisco, California)